The Mysterious Benedict Society is an American mystery adventure television series based on the children's books by Trenton Lee Stewart.  The series stars Tony Hale as Mr. Benedict, who gathers four children to stop a global emergency. Hale also portrays Benedict's twin brother, Mr. Curtain, who is the founder of the school the children infiltrate. The first season premiered on Disney+ on June 25, 2021, and consisted of eight episodes. In September 2021, the series was renewed for a second season. The second season premiered with two episodes on October 26, 2022, after their linear premieres on Disney Channel the day before. In January 2023, the series was canceled after two seasons.

Premise
During a global crisis called "The Emergency", Mr. Benedict, a talented and smart individual, recruits four kids for a dangerous mission to infiltrate the Learning Institute for Veritas and Enlightenment (L.I.V.E) on Nomansan Island. The Institute is a school run by Dr. L.D. Curtain, who is sending messages that infiltrate one's subconscious using children, which allows him to slip ideas and thoughts into people's minds. Mr. Benedict sends the four kids he has recruited into the Institute to stop this nefariousness and to save the world from Dr. Curtain's machinations.

Cast and characters

Main
 Tony Hale as Mr. Nicholas Benedict, the leader of the Mysterious Benedict Society. He has type 1 narcolepsy with cataplexy and faints when experiencing intense emotions. Assisted by his trusty associates, Benedict camps out by the Institute for most of the series to keep watch over the children. 
 Hale also portrays Dr. L.D. Curtain/Nathaniel Benedict, the founder of the Institute and Benedict's long-lost twin brother. He is secretly working on a machine called the Whisperer that is causing a worldwide emergency.
 Luke Roessler plays the young versions of Nicholas and Nathaniel.
 Kristen Schaal as Number Two, an associate of Benedict
 MaameYaa Boafo as Rhonda Kazembe, an associate of Benedict
 Ryan Hurst as Milligan, an associate of Benedict
 Gia Sandhu as Ms. Perumal, Reynie's tutor in the orphanage
 Mystic Inscho as Reynard "Reynie" Muldoon, one of the children Benedict recruits. He is intelligent and resourceful.
 Seth Carr as George "Sticky" Washington, one of the children Benedict recruits. He is incredibly smart and can remember everything he reads.
 Trae Maridadi plays young Sticky.
 Emmy DeOliveira as Kate Wetherall, one of the children Benedict recruits. She always carries around a bucket with tools she might need.
 Leia Bajic plays young Kate.
 Marta Kessler as Constance Contraire, the youngest prodigy of the children Benedict recruits

Recurring
 Saara Chaudry as Martina Crowe, a student at the Institute who competes with Reynie and Sticky and recruits Kate to her tetherball team.
 Katherine Evans as Jillson, one of the children's guides when they arrive at the Institute.
 Ben Cockell as Jackson, one of the children's guides when they arrive at the Institute.
 Reece Noi as Marlon, Dr.Curtains second in command
 Fred Melamed as Captain Noland, skipper of the luxurious ocean liner The Shortcut, upon which the young detectives travel the world.
 Shannon Kook as Mr. Oshiro, a teacher who works at the Institute and often puzzles his students with brain teasers and questions.
 Ricardo Ortiz as S.Q., Curtain's adopted son, who is oblivious to his evil deeds and befriends Reynie.
 Trenna Keating as Dr. Garrison, Curtain's chief scientist working on the Whisperer.
 Joel de la Fuente as Officer "Cannonball" Zhao, Captain Noland's second in command who suspects the children are stowaways.
 Lex King as Ilsa, the leader of Dr. Garrison's mercenaries who are disguised as water polo players.

Guests
 Bronson Pinchot as Yanis, a friendly Danish man who runs an inn with his wife Sofia.
 Pip Pellens as Sofia, a friendly Danish woman who runs an inn with her husband Yanis.
 Harriet Sansom Harris as Rowena Two, Number Two's strict mother.
 Christina Kirk as Charity Two, Number Two's very odd sister.
 Haley Joel Osment as One Two, Number Two's happy-go-lucky brother.

Episodes

Season 1 (2021)

Season 2 (2022)

Production

Development
It was announced in September 2019 that a series order for an adaptation of the Trenton Lee Stewart fantasy book series of the same name was close to completion at Hulu. Phil Hay and Matt Manfredi wrote the pilot episode with James Bobin set to direct. Todd Slavkin and Darren Swimmer were set as showrunners for the series. In November 2020, the series was moved to Disney+. In February 2021, it was announced that the series would consist of eight episodes and premiere on June 25, 2021. In July 2021, Hay and Manfredi said that, should the series be renewed for future seasons, they would incorporate and combine elements from the book series instead of each season being straight adaptations. On September 28, 2021, Disney+ renewed the series for a second season. On January 29, 2023, Disney+ canceled the series after two seasons.

Casting
Tony Hale was cast in February 2020 to portray twin brothers Mr. Benedict and Mr. Curtain. Kristen Schaal, MaameYaa Boafo, Ryan Hurst, Gia Sandhu, Mystic Inscho, Seth Carr, Emmy DeOliveira, and Marta Kessler were added as series regulars, playing Number Two, Rhonda, Milligan, Ms. Perumal, Reynie Muldoon, George 'Sticky' Washington, Kate Wetherall, and Constance Contraire, respectively, in April. Upon learning that he had gotten the role, Inscho said that he was "thrilled" and felt that the casting "made all of the hard work and efforts [he] put in worth it."

Writing 
About playing both Benedict and Curtain and differentiating the characters, Hale noted that reading the books showed him "just how affable Mr. Benedict is — he comes from a place of compassion and love. And then Curtain, you hear more of their backstory as the show goes, but he's got a tremendous amount of pain and trauma — he's also very misunderstood." He described Benedict as an "erratic and befuddled" person with terrible posture, which was fun for Hale to portray. He also enjoyed working with Trenton Lee Stewart, saying, "Working with a writer like that, and just how many twists and turns he puts in the series, that is just candy for an actor. It's just so fun to work with." On playing Curtain, Hale elaborated, "It would have been easy to play the idea of an evil twin. But I wanted to find parts of him with which I resonated: his humanity, mainly. He probably feels misunderstood and this comes from his own pain." Hale also added that the character would not be the same if it were not for the hair, costume, and makeup put in to his overall getup. He finds parts of the characters that are like himself in order to play the role properly.

Inscho noted in an interview that the themes he hoped viewers would take away from watching the series would be those of family and friendship, while Carr hoped they would take away the message that "the impossible is possible". Regarding his character, Carr said what he admires most is George's empathy, saying, "I feel like his empathy plays a big part in him caring for others when others didn't really care for him. So, I feel like, in a way, he's kind of like a lone wolf until he found his buddies." In another interview, DeOliveira said that the character of Kate Wetherall is "really fun, she is stubborn, adventurous, brave, and independent" and complemented her "willingness to just go for it, she doesn't always think everything through, but she is not afraid to just jump in." Speaking to her character's story arc in the series and commenting on whether the viewers might see more of her character in content to come, actor Gia Sandhu noted that Ms. Perumal "surprises herself in how much she realises she cares for Reynard. She depends on him a lot more than she expects in the beginning."

Filming
Filming was initially set to begin in mid 2020 in British Columbia, but was delayed due to the COVID-19 pandemic. It officially began filming on August 26, with scenes shot at Gastown, Vancouver in November. Filming concluded on January 19, 2021. Filming for the second season relocated to California with the state's film and TV tax credits program.

Visual effects
Folks VFX provide the visual effects for the series. Philippe Thibault serves as visual effects supervisor. He described working on the series as "making eight little movies". Thibault read the original books, and "stressed the importance of respecting the origin of this beautiful story." The CG team, led by Gabriel Beauvais. They created their own tools within Houdini, and worked to incorporate real locations and buildings with the computer generated buildings without it being noticeable.

Music 
Theodore Shapiro and Joseph Shirley compose the series' music. The soundtrack of The Mysterious Benedict Society includes multiple classic rock songs. Screenwriter Phil Hay noted that they "had this idea together that this is a type of music that we love that has a real specific place. That sort of '70s AM power pop, we sort of realized in a strange collision of all the stuff in this, visually and storywise, that this world, that's what people listen to in our mind. That's the kind of music people love."

Marketing
Disney released a trailer for the series on May 20, 2021, as well as promotional art and teaser images.

Release
The series debuted on June 25, 2021, with a two episode premiere. It consisted of 8 episodes, and ran until August 6, 2021.<ref>{{Cite press release|title=Twinning! "The Mysterious Benedict Society Debuts On Disney+ With A Super Sized Two Episode Premiere On Friday, June 25|date=June 21, 2021|url=https://dmedmedia.disney.com/news/disney-plus-mysterious-benedict-society-two-episode-premiere-june-25|publisher=Disney+}}</ref> The second season premiered on October 26, 2022, with two episodes.

The series made its linear premiere on Disney Channel on October 25, 2022, airing the second season before Disney+, with further airings every Tuesday starting November 1, 2022.

Reception

 Critical reception 
On Rotten Tomatoes, the series holds an approval rating of 86% based on 22 critic reviews, with an average rating of 7.90/10. The website's critics consensus reads, "The Mysterious Benedict Society has a slow windup, but its delightful supporting cast and sparky tone make for winning family entertainment." On Metacritic, it has a weighted average score of 66 out of 100, based on 7 critics, indicating "generally favorable reviews."

Daniel D'Addario of Variety gave the show a positive review and stated, "Within the growing set of shows about kids asked to save the world, The Mysterious Benedict Society stands out, and might itself save a rainy weekend for curious kids sometime this summer." Joel Keller of Decider gave the show a positive review and stated that it was "smart without being overly precious, but is just weird enough to keep kids' attention." Petrana Radulovic of Polygon gave the show a positive review and stated that it "has all the components a great kid classic needs." Josh Bell of CBR gave the show a positive review and stated, "The characters are distinctive and appealing enough to keep The Mysterious Benedict Society engaging even in its slower early stages." James Croot of Stuff.co.nz gave the show a positive review and stated that it was "brightly coloured, bold and bravura in its execution."

Ashley Moulton of Common Sense Media gave the show five out of five and an '8+' age rating, stating "Everything about it is superb -- its acting, storytelling, and wonderfully immersive dystopian world." Kristen Lopez of IndieWire gave the show a 'B+' and stated, "Manfredi and Hay aren't afraid to create a series that both praises the intelligence of children while also admitting that being a kid is weird and confusing." Joseph Stanichar of Paste gave the show 7.5 out of 10 and stated, "Even though the children's performances fell a bit short, I hope that they'll grow on me throughout the series. For now, the promise of Hale's dual roles and seeing how future scenes will be presented is more than enough to convince me to keep watching." Nick Spacek of Starburst gave the show 4 out of 5 and stated, "Rather than being something for children with a few jokes the grown-ups will appreciate, it has the same youthful joie de vivre as a film like Moonrise Kingdom, but with the vivacity and energy of Spy Kids." Joanne Soh of The New Paper gave the show 4 out of 5 and stated, "Hale may be brilliant as the narcoleptic genius, but the child actors are the real heroes, especially the scene-stealing Kessler." Brad Newsome of The Sydney Morning Herald gave the show 3.5 out of 5 and stated, "Based on the novel by Trenton Lee Stewart, and with a quirky tone set by producer-director James Bobin (Flight of the Conchords), it should captivate its intended audience." Lucy Mangan of The Guardian gave the show 3 out of 5 and stated, "What could have offered children a chance to understand the historically unprecedented aspects of the internet age they live in, made the young fish conscious of the water they swim in, is left simply as a romp."

Nick Allen of RogerEbert.com'' gave the show a negative review and stated, "The first two episodes have a start-and-stop energy, with more tests leading to more tests, and it gets more and more tedious." Dan Fienberg of The Hollywood Reporter gave the show a negative review and stated, "There could be potential here, but not enough to build real enthusiasm."

Accolades

Notes

References

External links
 
 

2020s American children's television series
2020s American mystery television series
2021 American television series debuts
2022 American television series endings
American children's adventure television series
American children's mystery television series
American television shows based on children's books
Children's and Family Emmy Award winners
Disney+ original programming
English-language television shows
Television productions postponed due to the COVID-19 pandemic
Television series about orphans
Television series by 20th Century Fox Television
Television shows filmed in Vancouver
The Mysterious Benedict Society